Lisa Lu Yan (born January 19, 1927) is a Chinese actress. She won the Golden Horse Awards three times in the 1970s. She is the only person who is a member of both the Hollywood Foreign Press Association and the Academy of Motion Picture Arts and Sciences.

Life 
Lu was born in Beijing in 1927. 

Her husband was Shelling Hwong (1922-1996). They had three children, including composer Lucia Hwong.

Career 
During Lu's teen years, she was active in Chinese opera, or Kunqu, before emigrating to the United States, where, beginning in the 1950s, she enjoyed a long career in television.

During the 1958–59 television season, she had a recurring role as Miss Mandarin on the cult western show Yancy Derringer, set in New Orleans in 1868. In 1961 she had a recurring role as "Hey Girl" on the television series Have Gun – Will Travel. She made numerous other appearances on television, with guest starring roles on Bonanza, The Big Valley, The Richard Boone Show, The Virginian, Hawaiian Eye, The Man from U.N.C.L.E., The Rebel, Cheyenne, Bat Masterson, Kentucky Jones, and other shows.

In 1960, she was the female lead in the antiwar film The Mountain Road, which starred James Stewart and which was based on the novel of the same name by the China war correspondent Theodore H. White.  Her film career took off in the 1970s with supporting roles in films like Demon Seed and Peter Bogdanovich's Saint Jack. During this time, she received three Best Actress Golden Horse Awards for her Chinese-language films The Arch, The Empress Dowager, and The Fourteen Amazons.

For the remainder of her career, Lu alternated between theatre and film. She may be best known by English-speaking audiences for her roles in the 1988 TV miniseries Noble House, and the films The Last Emperor (1987), The Joy Luck Club (1993), and Crazy Rich Asians (2018).

Filmography

Film

Television

Chinese opera
Lu attempted to popularise Chinese opera in the United States, touring universities and performing in English.

Recordings
The Reunion, a Peking Opera. with Lisa Lu and K.S. Chen, Lyrichord, 1972

Awards

See also 
 Golden Horse Award for Best Leading Actress

References

External links

 
 
 
 
 her biography in Chinese
 Biography at Jiao Tong Universities Alumni Foundation of America

1927 births
20th-century American actresses
21st-century American actresses
20th-century Chinese actresses
21st-century Chinese actresses
American actresses of Chinese descent
American film actresses
American television actresses
American soap opera actresses
American stage actresses
Chinese emigrants to the United States
Chinese film actresses
Living people
Singers from Beijing
Actresses from Beijing
Chinese Civil War refugees
Kunqu actresses
20th-century Chinese women singers
20th-century American women singers
20th-century American singers
Chinese–English translators